Yau Yat Tsuen or Yau Yat Chuen is one of the very few low density upscale neighbourhoods in the central urban area of Kowloon, Hong Kong. It is located in North Kowloon, at the foot of Beacon Hill. An electoral constituency of Sham Shui Po District is also named after the neighbourhood.

Naming
The area's name comes from a poem by Southern Song era poet Lu You, titled Touring Shanxi Village. The name comes from the fourth verse in the poem, which translates to Then out of the shade of the willows, came bright flowers and another village. Hence, the area's name literally translates to "another village".

Facilities
As a primarily residential area, there are relatively few services inside Yau Yat Tsuen. There is a small supermarket, a few property agents, a post office and a few other local stores. However a large shopping centre, Festival Walk, is on the edge of the village. It consists of 200 stores including a cinema and an ice-skating rink. The whole area of Yau Yat Tsuen is also within walking distance from the Kwun Tong line (Shek Kip Mei and Kowloon Tong) and East Rail line (Kowloon Tong) of MTR, the only mass transit railway operator of Hong Kong.

History
After the Second World War, affluent families built large detached houses in the area of Yau Yat Tsuen. Since then, it has been expanded and covers a much larger area. Along with the neighbouring Kowloon Tong and Beacon Hill, the area has some of the most exclusive and expensive residential properties in Kowloon.

Development

1970s
In the 1970s, some of the large houses were subdivided into approximately ten flats in each block. However, with high property prices in Hong Kong, these 3 or 4 bedroom flats, which tend to cost more than 7 million Hong Kong dollars, are still prohibitively expensive for a large section of the Hong Kong population.

1980s
In the 1980s, the large development scheme of Village Garden was constructed and more  flats and houses were built.

1990s
In the early 1990s Yau Yat Tsuen continued to expand with the development of Parc Oasis, where more than twenty 10-storey blocks were developed. In 1992 the nearby Polytechnic gained University status and became the City University of Hong Kong.

Education
 Chan Shu Kui Memorial School

Yau Yat Tsuen is in Primary One Admission (POA) School Net 40. Within the school net are multiple aided schools (operated independently but funded with government money) and two government schools: Fuk Wing Street Government Primary School and Li Cheng Uk Government Primary School.

References

 
New Kowloon